PDZ domain-containing RING finger protein 3 is a protein that in humans is encoded by the PDZRN3 gene.

References

Further reading